is a town in Nishiusuki District, Miyazaki Prefecture, Japan.

, the town had an estimated population of 3,537 and a density of 20.6 persons per km². The total area is 171.73 km². Much of the population work as farmers and fisherman, producing sansai and seema.

Geography

Climate
Gokase has a humid subtropical climate (Köppen climate classification Cfa) with hot, humid summers and cool winters.

Demographics
Per Japanese census data, the population of Gokase in 2020 is 3,472 people. Gokase has been conducting censuses since 1920.

Transportation 
There are no train stations in Gokase and the nearest station is Takamori in Takamori, Kumamoto.

Highways 

 Kyushu Chuo Expressway
 Japan National Route 218
 Japan National Route 265
 Japan National Route 503

References

External links

 Gokase official website 

Towns in Miyazaki Prefecture